Mariya Vyacheslavovna Netesova ( (born 26 May 1983 in Yekaterinburg) is a Russian rhythmic gymnast. She won a gold medal at the 2000 Summer Olympics.

References

External links 
 

1983 births
Living people
Sportspeople from Yekaterinburg
Russian rhythmic gymnasts
Olympic gymnasts of Russia
Olympic gold medalists for Russia
Gymnasts at the 2000 Summer Olympics
Olympic medalists in gymnastics
Medalists at the 2000 Summer Olympics